Telstar 4 (also called Telstar 402R and Telstar 403) was a communications satellite owned by AT&T Corporation.

Telstar 4 was successfully launched into space on September 24, 1995, by means of an Ariane-42L vehicle from the Kourou Space Center, French Guiana. It had a launch mass of 3,410 kg. 

Telstar 4 stopped operating on September 19, 2003, after a short circuit in the primary power bus.

References

External links

 Gunter's Space Page - Telstar 401, 402, 402R
 Nasa NSSDC Entry

Communications satellites in geostationary orbit
Spacecraft launched in 1995